FC Steel Trans Ličartovce was a former Slovak football club which was playing in the east-Slovak village of Ličartovce.

Steel Trans Ličartovce owner Blažej Podolák bought by financial problems worried club 1. FC Košice in 2004 and merged with his Ličartovce as reserve squad.  The club was renamed to MFK Košice before Second Division 2005–06 season and moved to the city of Košice on Lokomotíva Stadium, previously home ground of FC Lokomotíva Košice and 1. FC Košice.

Honours
 Slovak Cup
 Runners-up (1): 2004
 Slovak Second Division
 Runners-Up (4): 2001–02, 2002–03, 2003–04, 2004–05

References

External links
MFK Košice

Steel Trans Licartovce
Steel Trans Licartovce
Steel Trans Licartovce
1938 establishments in Slovakia
2005 disestablishments in Slovakia

de:MFK Košice#Geschichte FC Steel Trans Ličartovce